Joe Gideon & the Shark is an English blues/indie rock band formed in London, England.

History
After the disband of Bikini Atoll, Joe Gideon and his younger sister Viva Seifert formed Joe Gideon & the Shark. Gideon plays bass and guitar and sings, Seifert (The Shark) plays drums and piano and 8-track.

Discography

Albums 
 Harum Scarum (2010) Bronzerat Records
 Freakish (7 January 2013) Bronzerat Records

References

External links

English blues rock musical groups
Musical groups from London